Meeussen's rule is a special case of tone reduction in Bantu languages. The tonal alternation it describes is the lowering, in some contexts, of the last tone of a pattern of two adjacent High tones (HH), resulting in the pattern HL. The phenomenon is named after its first observer, the Belgian Bantu specialist A. E. Meeussen (1912–1978). In phonological terms, the phenomenon can be seen as a special case of the Obligatory Contour Principle.

The term "Meeussen's Rule" (the spelling with a capital R is more common) first appeared in a paper by John Goldsmith in 1981. It is based on an observation made by Meeussen in his 1963 article on the Tonga verb stating that "in a sequence of determinants, only the first is treated as a determinant". It was John Goldsmith who reformulated this as the rule HH > HL (or, as he expressed it, H → L / H     ) which later became well known as Meeussen's Rule.

Meeussen's rule is one of a number of processes in Bantu languages by which a series of consecutive high tones is avoided. These processes result in a less tonal, more accentual character in Bantu tone systems, ending finally in a situation in which there tends to be only one tone per word or morpheme.

Examples 
Here are some illustrations of the phenomenon in Kirundi (examples adapted from Philippson 1998).

In verb forms
 na-rá-zi-báriira   (I-PAST-them.CL10-to sew)   'I was sewing them' (them refers to a class 10 plural)
 na-rá-bariira   (I-PAST-to sew)   'I was sewing'
In the first sentence, both the tense marker rá and the verb form báriira (to sew) carry a high tone, signified by the acute accent. They are separated by the pronominal marker zi. In the second sentence, the pronominal marker zi is left out, resulting in two adjacent High tones. Due to the phenomenon described by Meeussen's rule, the second High tone changes into a Low tone.

In noun forms
 bukéeye > umuɲábukéeye
 mwáaro > umuɲámwaaro
These examples show a way of deriving from place names nouns with the meaning 'a person originating from'. In the first example, the place name bukéeye has a High tone on the second syllable. The junction with umuɲá ('person from') has no influence on this tone. In the second example, a place name with a High tone on the first syllable is used. Like above, the second High tone of the resulting pattern of two adjacent High tones is changed into a Low tone due to the phenomenon described by Meeussen's rule.

HHH > HLL
Just as HH (High tone + High tone) can become HL (High tone + Low tone) by Meeussen's rule, so also HHH will often become HLL, and HHHH will become HLLL. Thus in the Luganda language of Uganda, the word *bá-lí-lába 'they will see', which theoretically has three High tones, is actually pronounced bálilabá with only one. (The tone on the last syllable is an automatically generated phrasal tone; see Luganda tones.)

This process does not operate in the same way in every language, however. For example, in Shona, a Bantu language of Zimbabwe, the similar verb *á-chá-téngá 'he will buy' transforms to á-cha-téngá, where only one syllable is lowered by Meeussen's rule.

Exceptions to Meeussen's rule
Spreading of a tone across two or more syllables is quite common in Bantu languages. Tones which derive from spreading (or from plateauing, which is the spreading of high pitch from one high tone to another) are not affected by Meeussen's rule. Thus in the Chewa language of Malawi, for example, when the word kuphíka 'to cook' is followed by a direct object such as nyama 'meat', the tone on the penultimate syllable will spread: kuphíká nyama 'to cook meat'.

There are many other exceptions to Meeussen's rule. For example, in verbs in Shona, in certain circumstances two high tones may occur in adjacent syllables. In the subjunctive tí-téngésé 'we should sell', both tí and té- have underlying high tones (the high tones of -ngésé arise from tone spreading), yet the tone of té- is not deleted. Likewise in the Chewa verb a-ná-ká-fótokoza 'he went and explained', the tone of ká 'go and' does not get lowered, despite following the high-toned tense-marker ná.

References

Bibliography

Goldsmith, John (1981). "Towards an Autosegmental Theory of Accent: The Case of Tonga", Indiana University Linguistics Club.
Goldsmith, John (1984a) "Meeussen's Rule" in Aronoff, M. & Oehrle, R (eds.), Language Sound Structure, Cambridge, Mass., MIT.
Goldsmith, John (1984b), "Tone and accent in Tonga", in Clements, G.N. & Goldsmith, J. (1984) Autosegmental Studies in Bantu Tone. Dordrecht.
Hyman, Larry M. & Francis X. Katamba (1993). "A new approach to tone in Luganda", in Language. 69. 1, pp. 33–67.
Kanerva, Jonni M. (1990). Focus and Phrasing in Chichewa Phonology. New York, Garland.
 Meeussen, A.E. (1963) "Morphotonology of the Tonga verb". Journal of African Languages, 2.72–92.
Myers, Scott (1997) "OCP Effects in Optimality Theory", Natural Language & Linguistic Theory, Vol. 15, No. 4.
 Sharman, J.C. & A.E. Meeussen (1955) 'The representation of structural tones, with special reference to the tonal behaviour of the verb, in Bemba, Northern Rhodesia'. Africa, 25, 393-404.
 Philippson, Gérard (1998) Tone reduction vs. metrical attraction in the evolution of Eastern Bantu tone systems. Paris: INALCO. (online version)

Meeussen's rule
Sound laws